Sinabang is a town on the east coast of Simeulue Island, which lies off the western coast of Sumatra in Indonesia. Sinabang is the administrative seat (capital) of the Simeulue Regency, in Aceh Province of Indonesia and has a population of approximately 20,000.

Earthquakes

On 28 March 2005, an earthquake and subsequent fire destroyed 50 to 60 percent of the downtown area and significantly damaged the port facility. The land rose 40 cm at Sinabang as a result of the quake.

Climate
Sinabang has a tropical rainforest climate (Af) with heavy to very heavy rainfall year-round.

Notes

Populated coastal places in Indonesia
Populated places in Aceh
Regency seats of Aceh